Downfall (German: Der Absturz) is a 1923 German silent film directed by Ludwig Wolff and starring Asta Nielsen, Gregori Chmara and Charlotte Schultz. The film was produced by Nielsen's own production company. The sets were designed by the art director Heinrich Beisenherz. It premiered in Düsseldorf and had its Berlin premiere at the Marmorhaus. The film survives but is missing its first reel.

Plot
Kaja Falk is a successful and admired operetta star, who has been through a lot in her life: The man she loves has to pay for a murder Kaja is suspected to have committed. He accepts the punishment and is sent to jail for ten years. Full of gratitude Kaja promises her love to stay faithful and wait for him to return. In the following years, he dreams of her every night. In his dreams she is the young, admirable woman, for whom he took his prison sentence. In reality the ten years of his absence did not do Kaja well. When he finally returns, Kaja has aged a lot and is ravaged by disease. Out of prison, he waits for Kaja, who apparently did not come looking for him. But Kaja is there - he just did not recognize the old woman, who wanted to welcome her great love. Shocked and struck by grieve, Kaja collapses.

Cast
 Asta Nielsen as Kaja Falk  
 Gregori Chmara as Peter Karsten 
 Charlotte Schultz as Henrike Thomsen 
 Adele Sandrock as Mutter Karsten  
 Albert Bozenhard as Frank Lorris  
 Hans Wassmann as Besucher  
 Ivan Bulatov as Graf Lamotte  
 Ida Wogau as Kajas Kammerfrau
 Arnold Korff

References

Bibliography
 Hans-Michael Bock and Tim Bergfelder. The Concise Cinegraph: An Encyclopedia of German Cinema. Berghahn Books.

External links

1923 films
Films of the Weimar Republic
Films directed by Ludwig Wolff
German silent feature films
German black-and-white films